David Patterson (born 1948) is a historian and professor at the Ackerman Center for Holocaust Studies, University of Texas at Dallas. Patterson's areas of expertise are Holocaust, Jewish Thought, Anti-Semitism and Israel.
He is the Hillel A. Feinberg Distinguished Chair in Holocaust Studies. Patterson is author of a study of Holocaust memoir literature and said that reading of first person testimonials has a function, the reader "must become not an interpreter of texts but a mender of the world, a part of the recovery that this memory demands".

Works

References

21st-century American historians
21st-century American male writers
University of Texas at Dallas faculty
Historians of the Holocaust
Writers on antisemitism
Living people
1948 births
American male non-fiction writers